Loulans-Verchamp is a commune in the Haute-Saône department in the region of Bourgogne-Franche-Comté in eastern France.

Geographical Location 
Loulans Verchamp is situated at a distance of:
 12 km from Rioz via road D15
 25 km from Vesoul via roads D15 and N57
 30 km from Besançon via roads D25 or D15 and N57
 120 km from Neuchatel in Switzerland via N57.
 160 km from Lausanne in Switzerland via N57.

Loulans Verchamp is neighboured:
 On the north, by Roche-sur-Linotte-et-Sorans-les-Cordiers and Ormenans
 On the north-west by Villers-Pater
 On the west by Beaumotte-Aubertans
 On the south-west by Cenans
 On the south by Germondans of the Doubs region 
 On the south-east by Flagey-Rigney of the Doubs region
 On the east by Maussans and Larians-et-Munans
 On the north-east by Montbozon
 The Linotte crosses the village of Loulans Verchamp, to join the river Ognon (Franche-Comté).

Roads and access 
 The D15 and the D25 pass through Loulans Verchamp, connecting it to Vesoul on the north and to Besançon on the south.
 The high-speed railway line station Gare de Besançon-Auxon of the LGV Rhin-Rhône is situated at 30 km from Loulans Verchamp. It connects Besançon to Paris in just over two hours, with eight services a day (as of 2011).
 The Vesoul train station is 27 km away.
 The TGV – Gare de Besançon-Viotte train station is 32 km away.
 Neuchatel (Switzerland) is 120 km away.
 Lausanne (Switzerland) is 160 km away.

Demographics

Commerce 
In the village there are two bar hotel restaurants, a bakery a hairdresser and a beauty salon.

Personalities linked to this commune 
 Dominique Prétot (Papy) – president of the football club Union Sportive Larians – Munans, since 1967.

Gallery 
Some images from the village:

See also
Communes of the Haute-Saône department

References

Communes of Haute-Saône